The Oh! Gravity. Tour is a 2007 concert tour by the alternative rock band Switchfoot, held to promote their sixth studio album, Oh! Gravity.  The tour began in Utrecht, Netherlands on January 31 and ended in Saint Joseph, Missouri on April 17.  During the 77-day tour, the band performed in nineteen states, six provinces in Canada, and three countries in Europe, plus several shows in the United Kingdom. The tour was depicted in one live concert film, Live at the Ventura Theatre, which was shot during the North American leg of the tour.

Set list
For the North American leg of the tour, Switchfoot brought pop/rock band Copeland as the opening act. They usually played a 45-minute to 1 hour long set, before Switchfoot took the stage to play a 2-hour long set.

Switchfoot's hit song Stars from their Nothing Is Sound album was the staple opener for the vast majority of the shows. The Oh! Gravity. Tour also marked the first time the band played the songs "Faust, Midas, and Myself" and "4:12", both from the album "Oh! Gravity.", live. Usually, Switchfoot ended their set, as in past tours, with an encore, playing their smash hit single "Dare You to Move". The band kept a diary called the "Daily Foot" on their website to document each show of the tour. The entries included each show's set list.

Switchfoot is known for their efforts to keep in touch with their fans and bring them alongside the process of writing, recording, releasing and playing an album. In the Oh! Gravity. Tour, the band took this a step further by allowing fans to vote on the set list. They also allowed people to vote for non-Switchfoot songs, promising to "learn it if we can (Jon)" and play them in their live shows.

Live show bootlegs
On February 9, 2006, Tim Foreman talked about the possibility of releasing CDs of every show Switchfoot does during the Oh! Gravity. Tour.

"Another thing that we've never done before: sell bootlegs of a few songs from the show at the end of the night. See for a lot of us, the end of the night comes too soon. This way, you could actually be listening to the show in your car on the way home from the gig! So we're still trying to figure this one out logistically, but where there's a will there's a way."

Switchfoot began selling these "live" CDs at the House of Blues on February 13.  Each night they made 100 CDs available, but the songs have been circulated through the World Wide Web with greater distribution, thanks to the band-approved website, switchfootbootlegs.com.

Tour dates

Festivals and other miscellaneous performances
Concert for the Cause: Benefit for the Omaha Children's Hospital
8th Annual Island Party 
Springfest
Rock the Boat Concert
Ichthus Music Festival
Alive Festival
Creation Festival
Cornerstone Festival
San Diego County Fair
Sonshine Festival
Spirit West Coast
Wisconsin State Fair
Missouri State Fair
Iowa State Fair
Kentucky State Fair
Wild Adventures 2007 Concert Series
Big Exo Day

References

Switchfoot Announces Dates for Oh, Gravity. Tour
Big Exo Day 2007

2006 concert tours
2007 concert tours
Switchfoot concert tours
Christian concert tours